Thomas Jarmoc (born April 19, 1987) is a Canadian volleyball player of Polish origins.

Personal life
Jarmoc was born in Calgary, Alberta. His parents are Poles. They emigrated from Poland before the birth of their children. He speaks Polish well and was his first language. Jarmoc's father is a former basketball player, mother is a former representative of Poland
in high jump. Jarmoc has two younger sisters - Caroline and Patrycja, who are also a volleyball player.

Career

Clubs
He started playing volleyball in the team of the University of Alberta. As a professional player debuted in Greek club AEK Athens. In 2011 moved to VfB Friedrichshafen. He won with club from Friedrichshafen German Cup 2012. Season 2012/2013 spent in VC Euphony Asse-Lennik and moved to Polish club Jastrzębski Węgiel in 2013. With this club Jarmoc won bronze medal of Polish Championship 2012/2013 and bronze medal of CEV Champions League 2014 after winning match against VC Zenit-Kazan. In 2014 left club from Jastrzębie-Zdrój.

Sporting achievements

Clubs

CEV Champions League
  2013/2014 - with Jastrzębski Węgiel

National championships
 2011/2012  German Cup, with VfB Friedrichshafen
 2013/2014  Polish Championship, with Jastrzębski Węgiel

References

External links 
 CEV player profile
 PlusLiga profile

1987 births
Living people
Sportspeople from Calgary
Canadian men's volleyball players
Expatriate volleyball players in Poland
Jastrzębski Węgiel players